Erik Niedling (born 1973 in Erfurt, Thuringia) is a German artist. He is also known for his 2010 film The Future of Art, a documentary on the contemporary art scene.

Life and works
Niedling was raised in Erfurt and lives in Berlin. His works revolve around the construction of history, the traces that history left in the collective mind. Later works are also marked with questions on collecting, archiving and organising, whereby the preservation and (fictitious) disappearance of one's own identity comes to the fore.

Since the mid-2000s, Niedling has established himself as a conceptual artist. Along with Ingo Niermann he directed and produced the documentary The Future of Art. It consist of interviews with contemporary artists, critics, and collectors such as Olafur Eliasson, Harald Falckenberg, Damien Hirst, Hans-Ulrich Obrist, Marina Abramović, Olaf Breuning, Terence Koh, Genesis P-Orridge, Boris Groys, and Tobias Rehberger. In the course of the film, Niermann develops the idea of a pyramid mountain as a work of art, which is also the individual burial place of a collector. At the end of the shooting, Niermann transferred the idea to Erik Niedling, who has since continued it in sometimes radical art projects. In particular, "Mein letztes Jahr" (My last year), in which Niedling, implementing a drill by Ingo Niermann, consistently lived for one year in the period from 1 March 2011 to 29 February 2012, as if it were his last. This was followed by exhibitions, publications and artistic acitions dealing with the realisation of the pyramid mountain and research into radical political movements.  On 8 May 2017, Niedling performed a ritual possession (Seizure) of the mountain Kleiner Gleichberg in the district of Hildburghausen (Thuringia) for the first time, where since then the "Burial of the White Man" has been held on the mountain every 8 May. A critical reflection of his activities took place through publications ("The Future of Art: A Diary", 2012), interviews and most recently with the novel "Burial of the White Man" (Sternberg Press 2019).

Selected exhibitions
 2005; Archiv, Goethe-Institut, Bratislava
 2006; Was ist deutsch? (group exhibition), Germanisches Nationalmuseum, Nuremberg
 2008; Formation, Hamish Morrison Galerie, Berlin
 2010; Status, Angermuseum, Erfurt
 2010; Redox, Hamish Morrison Galerie, Berlin
 2011; "Mein letztes Jahr", Tobias Naehring, Leipzig
 2012; 18.10.1973—29.02.2012, Neues Museum Weimar, Weimar
 2018; "The Future of Art: A Camp" – Haus am Lützowplatz, Berlin
 2021; "2048 (Cat, Man, Rider, Triangle)" – Galerie Tobias Naehring, Berlin
 2022; "Dokumentationszentrum Thüringen" – EXILE, Wien

Publications
 Wolfram Morath-Vogel, ed. (2006). "Fotografien = Photographs / Erik Niedling." Cologne: Schaden.com.
 Österreichisches Institut für Photographie und Medienkunst, ed. (2007). "Status / Erik Niedling." Vienna: ÖIP.
 ZERN, ed. (2008). "Formation / Erik Niedling." Contributions by Bernd Stiegler and Ingo Niermann. Ostfildern: Hatje Cantz.
 Erik Niedling with Ingo Niermann (2012). "The Future of Art: A Diary." With texts by Tom McCarthy, Erik Niedling, Ingo Niermann, and Amy Patton. Berlin: Sternberg Press.
 Erik Niedling with Ingo Niermann (2019). "Burial of the White Man". With contributions by Ann Cotten and Jakob Nolte. Berlin: Sternberg Press.

References

External links

Official website
Future of Art Interview with Erik Niedling & Ingo Niermann (The Tait Global, November 23, 2010)
Niedling's profile on Exile (Gallery)

1973 births
Living people
Film people from Thuringia
Artists from Erfurt
English-language film directors
Mass media people from Erfurt